Shingle Creek may refer to:

Places

Canada 
Shingle Creek (British Columbia), a stream in the Okanagan Valley
Shingle Creek, British Columbia, an unincorporated settlement

New Zealand
Shingle Creek, New Zealand, locality in Otago region

United States
Shingle Creek (Florida), a stream in Central Florida
Shingle Creek, Minneapolis, Minnesota, a neighborhood

See also 

 Shingle Creek Crossing, a shopping center in Brooklyn Center, Minnesota